Victoria Louise "Vicki" Van Meter (March 13, 1982 – March 15, 2008) was an American aviator. She was known for setting several distance-flying records for child pilots. At the age of 11, she became the youngest pilot to fly east to west across the continental United States of America, and the youngest female pilot to cross in either direction.

Early life
Van Meter first manipulated the controls of an airplane at the age of 10. On September 20, 1993, at the age of 11, she made headlines when she flew from Augusta, Maine, to San Diego, California, in a Cessna 172. A year later, she flew a Cessna 210 over the Atlantic Ocean to Scotland. After her flights, she appeared on The Tonight Show with Jay Leno and visited the White House.

In 2003, Van Meter was featured with 36 other female pilots in the traveling exhibit Women and Flight — Portrait of Contemporary Women Pilots, based on a book of the same name by Carolyn Russo.

Pursuant to the Federal Aviation Reauthorization Act of 1996 signed into law by President Bill Clinton on October 9, 1996, after the death of Jessica Dubroff, it is no longer legal in the United States (under 49 USC § 44724) to attempt to set records as a student pilot, which effectively means that some of the records set by Van Meter will never be broken by an American.

Personal life
Van Meter served as a Peace Corps volunteer in Moldova after graduating from Edinboro University with a degree in criminal justice. She worked as an insurance-company investigator and had made plans to pursue graduate studies.

Death
Van Meter died at her home in Meadville, Pennsylvania, on March 15, 2008, from a self-inflicted gunshot wound at the age of 26. Her suicide surprised her family, who believed that she had been coping with her depression.

See also
 Barrington Irving
 Jessica Dubroff

References

Further reading

External links
 
 

1982 births
2008 suicides
American expatriates in Moldova
Aviators from Pennsylvania
Edinboro University of Pennsylvania alumni
Peace Corps volunteers
People from Meadville, Pennsylvania
Suicides by firearm in Pennsylvania
American aviation record holders
American women aviation record holders
20th-century American women
2008 deaths
21st-century American women